Viləş FK is an Azerbaijani football club based in Masally. The club currently play in the AFFA Amateur League. Xayal Gahramanov and Deviko Khinjazov are the notable captains.

History
Founded as FK Masallı in 1967, they played in the AFFA Supreme League in 2007–08 after achieving promotion in 2007, but they withdrew from the league and were disestablished at the end of the season having finished in tenth place.

In 2013, the club reformed as FK Viləş Masallı and celebrated a 2–1 win over FC Saaatly in the AFFA Amateur League, in front of a crowd of 1,000. Their home stadium is Anatoly Banishevski Stadium. Home colours are white shirts, red shorts. Away colours are either red shirts and blue shorts, or blue shirts with white arms, blue shorts.

Stadium

The club's home ground is Anatoly Banishevski Stadium, a multi-use stadium in Masally, which has a capacity of 7,500.

Squads

Masallı in Europe

References

External links
FK Masallı at EUFO.DE

1967 establishments in Azerbaijan
2008 disestablishments in Azerbaijan
2013 establishments in Azerbaijan
Association football clubs disestablished in 2008
Association football clubs established in 1967
Association football clubs established in 2013
Football clubs in Azerbaijan
FK Masallı